Invictus Games is an independent Hungarian video game development studio founded in 1992 by Tamás Kozák and Ákos Diviánszky. They specialize in racing simulation games, like Project Torque, Street Legal and Street Legal Racing Redline, and Insane. In 2009, they have moved on to mobile games. They also developed onEscapee, a cinematic platforming game. Their publishers include Codemasters, Activision, 1C, Gamepot and Joyzone.

In March 2020, Invictus Games was acquired by Swedish publisher Zordix.

Games developed

References

External links

Invictus Games at MobyGames

Video game companies established in 1992
Video game development companies
Video game companies of Hungary
Hungarian companies established in 1992
Organisations based in Debrecen